Odalis or Odalys is a given name which may refer to:

 Odalys Adams (born 1966), Cuban former hurdler
 Odalys García (born 1975), Cuban actress, model, singer and show host
 Odalis Pérez (born 1977), former Major League Baseball pitcher from the Dominican Republic
 Odalis Revé (born 1970), Cuban former judoka, 1992 Olympic middleweight champion